Kuldesh Johal (born 25 September 1980) is an English former professional snooker player. He competed on the main tour during the 2008/2009 and 2010/2011 seasons.

Career

Born in 1980, Johal played in Challenge Tour qualifying events in the early 2000s, without any success. He won two Pontin's International Open Series events during the 2007/2008 season, defeating James Leadbetter, Matthew Couch, Jeff Cundy, Stuart Carrington and Andrew Pagett in Event 2 and Gary Wilson, Jamie Jones, Liam Highfield, Stephen Craigie and Simon Bedford in Event 6, winning a place on the main tour for the 2008/2009 season.

Johal's first season as a professional brought runs to the last 64 at two ranking tournaments - the 2008 UK Championship, where he beat Aditya Mehta and Paul Davies, both 9–5, before losing by the same scoreline to Michael Holt, and the 2009 China Open, where he overcame Michael Georgiou and Barry Pinches but lost 3–5 to Judd Trump. He lost his first-round qualifying match in the 2009 World Championship 8–10 to Jin Long, and finished the season ranked 80th, falling off the tour.

His performances in the minor tour events the following season were sufficient for him to return to the professional circuit for 2010/2011; however, he lost 18 of his 25 matches, the highlight being a run to the last 32 at PTC Event 2. There, he defeated Patrick Wallace 4–1 and Matthew Selt by the same scoreline, but surrendered a 3–1 lead over Alan McManus to lose 3–4. He concluded the season with a ranking of 86th, and was again relegated.

Having not played competitive snooker since 2012, Johal entered Q-School in 2015, aiming to regain his place on tour. In Event 2, he beat five opponents, including Jamie Clarke and Marcus Campbell – relegating the latter from professional snooker after a 24-year career – to reach the quarter-finals. Requiring only a victory in this match to return to the main tour, he was drawn against Jason Weston, but lost 2–4.

At the beginning of the 2015/2016 season, Johal received entries to the first three ranking events; he lost all three of his opening matches - in the Australian Goldfields Open, 1–5 to Zhao Xintong, at the Shanghai Masters, 4–5 to Craig Steadman and in the International Championship, 3–6 to Neil Robertson.

Performance and rankings timeline

Career finals

Pro-am finals: 1 (1 title)

Amateur finals: 4 (3 titles)

References

External links
  Kuldesh Johal at worldsnooker.com

English snooker players
Living people
1980 births
Sportspeople from Huddersfield